Sindiwe Magona (born 27 August 1943) is a South African writer.

Early life
Magona is a native of the former Transkei region, South Africa. She grew up in Gugulethu, a Cape Town township, and worked as a domestic while completing her secondary education by correspondence. Magona later graduated from the University of South Africa and earned her Master of Science degree in Organisational Social Work from Columbia University.

Career 
She starred as Singisa in the isiXhosa classic drama Ityala Lamawele.

She worked in various capacities for the United Nations for more than 20 years, retiring in 2003.

In the 2013 computer-animated adventure comedy film Khumba she was the voice actor for the character Gemsbok Healer.

She is Writer-in-Residence at the University of the Western Cape and has been a visiting Professor working at Georgia State University.

Author
Magona published two autobiographies: To My Children's Children and Forced To Grow; two collections of short stories: Living Loving and Lying Awake at Night and Push-Push and Other Stories; and four novels: Mother to Mother, Beauty's Gift, Life is a Hard but Beautiful Thing, and Chasing Tails of My Father's Cattle!

She published her autobiography, To My Children's Children, in 1990. In 1998, she published Mother to Mother, a fictionalized account of the Amy Biehl killing, which she adapted into a play. This was performed at the Baxter Theatre complex in late 2009 and the film rights were acquired by Type A Films in 2003. She wrote autobiographies and short story collections. Her novel Beauty's Gift was shortlisted for the 2009 Commonwealth Writers' Prize Best Book, Africa Region. In 2009, Please, Take Photographs, her first collection of poems, was published.

Her other works include Please, take Photographs! a book of poetry (Modjaji Books, 2009) and Awam Ngqo! a book of short stories (NASOU 2009) and prescribed for Grade 8; Twelve Books of Folktales – written in both English and Xhosa; translated into isiZulu; Setswana, Afrikaans; Sesotho; Sepedi; and published in September 2014 – David Philip; Skin We In, in collaboration with scientist Nina Jablonksy and illustrator Lynn Feldman – a book about skin colour and race.

Her children's books include The Best Meal Ever and Life is a hard but beautiful thing: English, Afrikaans. She created the first series for children in isiXhosa: Sigalelekile: 48 books (Via Afrika). She contributed more than twenty books in another series, Siyakhula (Oxford University Press).

Compilation: You Pay For The View – Maskew Miller Longman (2009)

With the Gugulethu Writers' Group she created Umthi ngamnye unentlaka yawo – short stories (Xhosa Realities, 2007); UNobanzi (Oxford University Press, 2010); UNyana weSizwe 2009 and 2010; and a series of 24 books (Igugu), from her workshop with students at the University of the Western Cape (David Philip Publishers, 2015). Two books of poetry, UWC students, will be published in isiXhosa.

Works
 1990 : To My Children's Children
 1991 : Living, Loving and Lying Awake at Night
 1992 : Forced to Grow
 1996 : Push Push
 1998 : Mother to Mother
 2006 : The Best Meal Ever!
 2008 : Beauty's Gift
 2009 : Please, Take Photographs
 2014 : The Woman on the Moon
 2016 : Chasing The Tails of My Father's Castle
 2016 : Books and Bricks
 2016 : Vukani
 2016 : The Ugly Duckling
 2016 : From Robben Island to Bishopscourt
 2016 : Clicking with Xhosa: A Xhosa Phrasebook

Recognition 
 Grinzane Award (2007) for writing that addresses social concerns
 Molteno Gold Medal (2007) for promoting Xhosa culture and language
 Lifetime Achievement Award (2007) for her contribution to South African literature 
 Order of iKhamanga (2011) Presidential Award and the highest such award in South Africa 
 Mbokodo Award (2012), joint winner with Nadine Gordimer

References

External links
 Sindiwe Magona official website

1943 births
21st-century South African novelists
Columbia University School of Social Work alumni
Living people
Recipients of the Molteno medal
Recipients of the Order of Ikhamanga
South African autobiographers
South African short story writers
South African women poets
South African women short story writers
University of South Africa alumni
Women autobiographers